Fuzzy or Fuzzies may refer to:

Music
 Fuzzy (band), a 1990s Boston indie pop band
 Fuzzy (composer) (born 1939), Danish composer Jens Vilhelm Pedersen
 Fuzzy (album), 1993 debut album by the Los Angeles rock group Grant Lee Buffalo
 "Fuzzy", a song from the 2009 Collective Soul album by Collective Soul
 "Fuzzy", a song by Poppy from Poppy.Computer

Nickname
 Faustina Agolley (born 1984), Australian television presenter, host of the Australian television show Video Hits
 Fuzzy Haskins (born 1941), American singer and guitarist with the doo-wop group Parliament-Funkadelic
 Fuzzy Hufft (1901−1973), American baseball player
 Fuzzy Knight (1901−1976), American actor
 Andrew Levane (1920−2012), American National Basketball Association player and coach
 Robert Alfred Theobald (1884−1957), United States Navy rear admiral
 Fuzzy Thurston (1933-2014), American National Football League player
 Fuzzy Vandivier (1903−1983), American high school and college basketball player
 Fuzzy Woodruff (1884−1929), American sportswriter
 Jeff Young (died 2011), co-founder of the American R&B group Somethin' for the People
 Fuzzy Zoeller (born 1951), American professional golfer

Other uses
 Fuzzy Q. Jones, a character played by Al St. John (1892-1963) in over 80 Western films
 Fuzzies, an alien species in H. Beam Piper's novel Little Fuzzy and two sequels
 Fuzzies, an age group of mice sold as pet food
 Fuzzy, a recurring Mario enemy

See also
 Fuzzy logic, a form of logic
 Fuzzy Control Language, a programming language
 Fuzzy markup language
 Fuzzy Wuzzy (disambiguation)
 Fuzz (disambiguation)

Lists of people by nickname